The Cu Lao Cham-Hoi An Biosphere Reserve is located in Quang Nam Province, in the central part of Vietnam, consisting of two core areas: the World Cultural Heritage Site of Hoi An and the Cu Lao Cham archipelago. It was recognised as a UNESCO Biosphere Reserve in 2009. 

The islands contain mountainous areas and rainforest ecosystems influenced by seasonal monsoons. The archipelago is also known for its marine species including corals, mollusks, crustaceans and seaweed. 

Cu Lao Cham-Hoi An has made initiatives in eliminating plastic bags and other single-use plastic movements since being recognised as a UNESCO Biosphere Reserve in 2009. Waste management and the lack of awareness continue to present a plastic challenge, despite some of the progress being made, which has led to Youth Initiative for an Ocean without Plastic being launched by UNESCO.

References

Biosphere reserves of Vietnam
Nature conservation in Asia
Quảng Nam province